Oscar Barney Finn (born 28 October 1938) is an Argentine film director and screenwriter. He directed seven films between 1974 and 1997. His 1985 film Count to Ten was entered into the 35th Berlin International Film Festival.

Filmography
 La balada del regreso (1974)
 Broken Comedy (1978)
 Más allá de la aventura (1980)
 De la misteriosa Buenos Aires (1981)
 Count to Ten (1985)
 Cuatro caras para Victoria (1992)
 Stolen Moments (1997)

References

External links

1938 births
Living people
Argentine film directors
Argentine screenwriters
Male screenwriters
Argentine male writers
Writers from Buenos Aires